This is a list of finalists for the 1993 Archibald Prize for portraiture (listed is Artist – Title).

Prize winners
The 1993 Archibald Prize winners were:
Garry Shead – Tom Thompson (Winner of the Archibald Prize)
 Angelika Erbsland – Colin Hayes OBE and friend (Winner of the Packing Room Prize) (''Note that the 1993 winner of the Packing Room Prize was not a finalist.)
    Jennifer Little – Victor Sellu (Winner of The People's Choice Award)

Finalists
The finalists were:
Davida Allen – Dressing for Dinner – (Governor-general Bill Hayden)
Kevin Connor – Self Portrait
Fred Cress – Philip Cox
Ken Done – Glen Murcutt 92
Brian Dunlop – David Dridan
Geoffrey Dyer – Dr Bob Brown (Environmentalist)
Francis Giacco – Portrait of Lee-Lin Chin
George Gittoes – Portrait of Ronaldo Cameron
    Robert Hannaford – Peter van Rood
    Robert Hannaford – Max Harris
Bill Leak – The Late Prof. Brin Newton-John
Kerrie Lester – Fred Hollows
    Jennifer Little – Victor Sellu (Winner of The People's Choice Award)
Keith Looby – A.D. Hope
Vladas Meskenas – Professor Fred Hollows
Lewis Miller – Gareth Sansom Painting
Josonia Palaitis – James Morrison
    Gretel Pinniger – Andrew Stevenson, Lawyer
William Robinson – Professor John Robinson and Brother William
    Aileen Rogers – Tim Schultz
 Paul Ryan – Chris Haywood
Jenny Sages – Keith Bain (Everyone is Doing the Farandole)
 Jenny Sands – Professor Alice Tay
Garry Shead – Tom Thompson (Winner of the Archibald Prize) (Image)
Jiawei Shen – PhD John Clark in black kimono (Image)
Bryan Westwood – Margaret Olley

See also
Previous year: List of Archibald Prize 1992 finalists
Next year: List of Archibald Prize 1994 finalists
List of Archibald Prize winners
Lists of Archibald Prize finalists

References

1993
Archibald Prize 1993
Archibald Prize 1993
1993 in art
Arch